Chapea is a bean stew, a popular dish from the countryside of the Dominican Republic. Kidney beans or white beans with longaniza (sausage), rice, and green plantains are the basic ingredients, with other meats, vegetables and mashed squash used as a thickener. The flavor is distinguished by the herb cilantro and a dash of sour orange juice (naranja agria).

See also 
 Fabada asturiana
 Feijoada
 List of stews

References

Dominican Republic cuisine
Stews
Legume dishes
Plantain dishes